Pete Hoener (born June 14, 1951) is a former American football coach. He previously served as an assistant coach in the National Football League (NFL) for the St. Louis Cardinals, Arizona Cardinals, Chicago Bears, San Francisco 49ers, Carolina Panthers, and Washington Football Team,. Hoener retired in 2022 after being in coaching since the 1970s.

References

1951 births
Living people
American football tight ends
American football defensive ends
Bradley Braves football players
Missouri Tigers football coaches
Illinois State Redbirds football coaches
Indiana State Sycamores football coaches
Illinois Fighting Illini football coaches
Purdue Boilermakers football coaches
TCU Horned Frogs football coaches
Iowa State Cyclones football coaches
Texas A&M Aggies football coaches
St. Louis Cardinals (football) coaches
Arizona Cardinals coaches
Chicago Bears coaches
San Francisco 49ers coaches
Carolina Panthers coaches
Washington Football Team coaches